Samuels is a surname. Notable people with the surname include:

 Andrew Samuels (born 1949), British psychologist
 Arthur Samuels (1852–1925), Irish politician
 Chris Samuels (born 1977), American football player
 Dale Samuels (born 1931), American football player
 Dave Samuels (born 1948), American musician
 David Samuels (political scientist), American political science professor
 David Samuels (EastEnders), fictional character in BBC TV soap opera EastEnders
 David Samuels (writer) (born 1967), American author
 Dover Samuels (born 1939), New Zealand politician
 Ernest Samuels (1903–1996), American biographer
 Giovonnie Samuels (born 1985), American actress
 Gordon Samuels (1923–2007), Australian lawyer and judge, Governor of New South Wales
 Howard C. Samuels (born 1952), American clinical psychologist
 Howard J. Samuels (1919–1984), American statesman, industrialist, civil rights activist and philanthropist
 Jamar Samuels (born 1989), American professional basketball player
 Jaylen Samuels (born 1996), American football player
 Joel Samuels, fictional character in Australian soap opera Neighbours
 John Samuels (born 1961), American actor
 Joseph Samuels, American musician and band leader
 Josh Samuels (born 1991), American water polo player 
 Kalman Samuels
 Lawrence Samuels (born 1970), American arena football player
 Lesser Samuels, (1894–1980), American screenwriter
 Lynn Samuels (1942–2011), American radio host
 Marlon Samuels (born 1981), Jamaican cricketer
 Martin A. Samuels is an American physician
 Maxwell Samuels (born 1940), Belizean politician
 Moss Turner-Samuels (1888–1957), British politician
 Robert Samuels (born 1971), Jamaican cricketer
 Ron Samuels, American film producer
 Samardo Samuels (born 1989), Jamaican basketball player
 Skyler Samuels, American actress
 Stanford Samuels III (born 1999), American football player
 Stephen Mitchell Samuels (1938–2012), American statistician and mathematician
 Theo Samuels (1873–1896), South African rugby union player
 Tony Samuels (1954–2001), American football player
 Warren Samuels (1933–2011), American economist and historian of economic thought

See also
 Samuel (disambiguation)
 Samuelson

Patronymic surnames